This is a list of Belgian television related events from 2005.

Events
20 March - Nuno Resende is selected to represent Belgium at the 2005 Eurovision Song Contest with his song "Le grand soir". He is selected to be the forty-seventh Belgian Eurovision entry during Eurosong held at the RTBF Studios in Brussels.
19 June - Katerine Avgoustakis wins the first season of the Flemish version of Star Academy.
Unknown - Launch of the Belgian version of The X Factor.
11 December - Udo Mechels wins the first season of X Factor.

Debuts
Unknown - X Factor (2005-2008)

Television shows

1990s
Samson en Gert (1990–present)
Familie (1991–present)
Wittekerke (1993-2008)
Thuis (1995–present)
Wizzy & Woppy (1999-2007)

2000s
Big Brother (2000-2007)
Idool (2003-2011)

Ending this year

Births

Deaths

See also
2005 in Belgium